KQQQ (1150 AM) is a radio station broadcasting a News Talk Information format. Licensed to Pullman, Washington, United States, the station serves the Pullman-Moscow area.  The station is currently owned by Radio Palouse, Inc. and features programming from ABC Radio, Premiere Radio Networks and Fox News Radio.

KQQQ is heard on FM translator K271CU (102.1 FM) from a transmitter in Pullman. Until September 2019, the station was heard on another translator, K284BW at 104.7, by way of sister KHTR's HD2 subchannel; this now is a separately programmed station.

1150 AM is a Regional broadcast frequency.

History
The station went on the air in 1950. By the 1970s, when it changed its call letters to KNOI (K#1), the station was airing a country format. The sister station was an automated rock format KQQQ-FM (KQ-105); KNOI was later changed to KQQQ on January 23, 1983.

References

External links
KQQQ Website

QQQ
Radio stations established in 1950
News and talk radio stations in the United States
Pullman, Washington